The Kyrgyz people (also spelled Kyrghyz, Kirgiz, and Kirghiz) are a Turkic ethnic group native to Central Asia. They are primarily found in Kyrgyzstan, Uzbekistan, China, Pakistan and Afghanistan. Kyrgyz Diaspora is also found in Russia, Tajikistan, and Kazakhstan. They speak the Kyrgyz language, which is the official language of Kyrgyzstan. 

The earliest Kyrgyz people were the descendants of several central Asian tribes, first emerging in western Mongolia around 201 BC. Modern Kyrgyz people are descended from the Yenisei Kyrgyz that lived in the Yenisey river valley in Siberia. The Kyrgyz people were constituents of the Tiele people, the Göktürks, and the Uyghur Khaganate before establishing the Yenisei Kyrgyz Khaganate in the 9th century, and later the Kyrgyz Khanate in the 15th century.

Etymology 
There are several theories on the origin of ethnonym Kyrgyz. It is often said to be derived from the Turkic word kyrk ("forty"), with -iz being an old plural suffix, so Kyrgyz literally means "a collection of forty tribes". It also means "imperishable", "inextinguishable", "immortal", "unconquerable" or "unbeatable", as well as its association with the epic hero Manas, who – according to a founding myth – unified the 40 tribes against the Khitans. A rival myth, recorded in 1370 in the History of Yuan, concerns 40 women born on a steppe motherland.

The earliest records of the ethnonym appear to have been the Chinese transcriptions Gekun (LH *kek-kuən < Old Chinese: *krêk-kûn) and Jiankun (LH *ken-kuən < OC: *kên-kûn). Those suggest that the original ethnonym was *kirkur ~ kirgur and/or *kirkün, and another transcription Jiegu (EMC: *kέt-kwət) suggests *kirkut / kirgut. Yury Zuev proposed that the ethnonym possibly means 'field people, field Huns' (cf. Tiele tribal name 渾 Hún < MC *ɣuən). Peter Golden reconstructs *Qïrğïz < *Qïrqïz< *Qïrqïŕ and suggests a derivation from Old Turkic qır 'gray' (horse color) plus suffix -q(X)r/ğ(X)r ~ k(X)z/g(X)z. Besides, Chinese scholars later used a number of different transcriptions for the Kyrgyz people: these include Gegu (紇骨), Jiegu (結骨), Hegu (紇骨), Hegusi (紇扢斯), Hejiasi (紇戛斯), Hugu (護骨), Qigu (契骨), or Juwu (居勿), and then, during the reign of Tang Emperor Wuzong, Xiajiasi (黠戛斯), said to mean "red face". Edwin G. Pulleyblank surmises that "red face" was possibly a folk etymology provided by an interpreter who explained the ethnonym based on Turkic qïzïl ~ qizqil, meaning 'red'. By the time of the Mongol Empire, the ethnonym's original meaning had apparently been forgotten – as was shown by variations in readings of it across different reductions of the History of Yuan. This may have led to the adoption of Kyrgyz and its mythical explanation.

During the 18th and 19th centuries, European writers used the early Romanized form  Kirghiz – from the contemporary Russian  – to refer not only to the modern Kyrgyz, but also to their more numerous northern relatives, the Kazakhs. When distinction had to be made, more specific terms were used:
the Kyrgyz proper were known as the Kara-Kirghiz ("Black Kirghiz", from the colour of their tents),
and the Kazakhs were named the Kaisaks. or "Kirghiz-Kazaks".

Origins 

The Kyrgyz are a Turkic ethnic group. Recent linguistic, genetic and archaeological evidence suggests that the earliest Turkic peoples descended from agricultural communities in Northeast China who moved westwards into Mongolia in the late 3rd millennium BC, where they adopted a pastoral lifestyle. By the early 1st millennium BC, these peoples had become equestrian nomads. In subsequent centuries, the steppe populations of Central Asia appear to have been progressively Turkified by a East Asian dominant minority moving out of Mongolia.

The early Kyrgyz people, known as Yenisei Kyrgyz, have their origins in the western parts of modern-day Mongolia and first appear in written records in the Chinese annals of the Sima Qian's Records of the Grand Historian (compiled 109 BC to 91 BC), as Gekun or Jiankun. The Middle Age Chinese composition Tanghuiyao of the 8–10th century transcribed the name "Kyrgyz" as Jiegu (Kirgut), and their tamga was depicted as identical to the tamga of present-day Kyrgyz tribes Azyk, Bugu, Cherik, Sary Bagysh and few others.

According to recent historical findings, Kyrgyz history dates back to 201 BC. The Yenisei Kyrgyz lived in the upper Yenisey River valley, central Siberia. In Late Antiquity the Yenisei Kyrgyz were a part of the Tiele people. Later, in the Early Middle Ages, the Yenisei Kyrgyz were a part of the confederations of the Göktürk and Uyghur Khaganates.

In 840, a revolt led by the Yenisei Kyrgyz brought down the Uyghur Khaganate, and brought the Yenisei Kyrgyz to a dominating position in the former Second Turkic Khaganate. With the rise to power, the center of the Kyrgyz Khaganate moved to Jeti-su, and brought about a spread south of the Kyrgyz people, to reach Tian Shan mountains and Xinjiang, bringing them into contact with the existing peoples of western China, especially Tibet.

The Kirghiz khagans of the Yenisei Kirghiz Khaganate claimed descent from the Han Chinese general Li Ling, which was mentioned in the diplomatic correspondence between the Kirghiz khagan and the Tang Dynasty emperor, since the Tang imperial Li family claimed descent from Li Ling's grandfather, Li Guang. The Kirghiz qaghan assisted the Tang dynasty in destroying the Uyghur Khaganate and rescuing the Princess Taihe from the Uyghurs. They also killed a Uyghur khagan in the process.

Then Kyrgyz quickly moved as far as the Tian Shan range and maintained their dominance over this territory for about 200 years. In the 12th century, however, Kyrgyz domination had shrunk to the Altai and Sayan Mountains as a result of Mongol expansion. With the rise of the Mongol Empire in the 13th century, the Kyrgyz migrated south. In 1207, after the establishment of Yekhe Mongol Ulus (Mongol empire), Genghis Khan's oldest son Jochi occupied Kyrgyzstan without resistance. The state remained a Mongol vassal until the late 14th century. Various Turkic peoples ruled them until 1685, when they came under the control of the Oirats (Dzungars).

By the 16th century, the carriers of the ethnonym Kirgiz lived in South Siberia, Xinjiang, Tian Shan, Pamir-Alay, Middle Asia, Urals (among Bashkirs), in Kazakhstan. In the Tian Shan and Xinjiang area, the term Kyrgyz retained its unifying political designation, and became a general ethnonym for the Yenisei Kirgizes and aboriginal Turkic tribes that presently constitute the Kyrgyz population. Though it is obviously impossible to directly identify the Yenisei and Tien Shan Kyrgyz, a trace of their ethnogenetical connections is apparent in archaeology, history, language and ethnography. A majority of modern researchers came to the conclusion that the ancestors of Kyrgyz tribes had their origin in the most ancient tribal unions of Sakas/Scythians, Wusun/Issedones, Dingling, Mongols, and Huns.

The oldest notes about a definite mention of the Kyrgyz ethnonym originate from the 6th century. There is a certain probability that there was relations between Kyrgyz and Gegunese already in the 2nd century BC and between Kyrgyz and Khakases since the 6th century AD, but there is a missing unique mention. The Kyrgyz as an ethnic group are mentioned quite unambiguously during the time of Genghis Khan's rule (1162–1227), when their name replaces the former name Khakas.

Genetics 

The genetic makeup of the Kyrgyz is consistent with their origin as a mix of tribes. For instance, 63% of modern Kyrgyz men of Jumgal District are Haplogroup R1a1 (Y-DNA). Low diversity of Kyrgyz R1a1 indicates a founder effect within the historical period.  Other groups of Kyrgyz especially Southwest Kyrgyz show considerably lower haplogroup R frequencies and almost lack haplogroup N (except for the Kyrgyz from Pamir).

Depending on the geographical location of samples, West Eurasian mtDNA haplogroup lineages make up 27% to 42.6% in the Kyrgyz, with haplogroup mtDNA H being the most predominant West Eurasian mtDNA haplogroup at about 14.2% (range 8.3% Talas to 21.3% Sary-Tash) among the Kyrgyz. However, the majority of Kyrgyz belong to East Eurasian mtDNA haplogroups, with mtDNA haplogroup D (approx. 20.2%, range 14.6% Talas to 25.5% Sary-Tash) and D4 in particular (approx. 18.5%) being the most frequent Eastern Eurasian lineage among them.

A 2011 study of autosomal ancestry found that East Eurasian ancestry is predominant in most Kyrgyz living in Kyrgyzstan. East Eurasian ancestry makes up roughly two-thirds with exceptions of Kyrgyz living in Tajikistan and the western areas of Kyrgyzstan, where it forms only half. A 2022 study found that Kyrgyz people from China were found to have more West Eurasian ancestry than the Kyrgyz from Kyrgyzstan. Kyrgyz people from China clustered more closely with Europeans and South Asians.

Religion 

Kyrgyz are predominantly Muslims of the Hanafi Sunni school. Islam was first introduced by Arab traders who travelled along the Silk Road in the 7th and 8th centuries. In the 8th century, orthodox Islam reached the Fergana valley with the Uzbeks. However, in the 10th-century Persian text Hudud al-'alam, the Kyrgyz was still described as a people who "venerate the Fire and burn the dead".

The Kyrgyz began to convert to Islam in the mid-17th century. Sufi missionaries played an important role in the conversion. By the 19th century, the Kyrgyz were considered devout Muslims and some performed the Hajj.

Atheism has some following in the northern regions under Russian communist influence. A few cultural rituals of shamanism are practiced to this day, particularly in Central Kyrgyzstan. During a July 2007 interview, Bermet Akayeva, the daughter of Askar Akayev, the former President of Kyrgyzstan, stated that Islam was increasingly taking root, even in the northern regions which had been under communist influence. She emphasized that many mosques have been built and that the Kyrgyz are "increasingly devoting themselves to Islam".

Many ancient indigenous beliefs and practices, including shamanism and totemism, coexisted syncretically with Islam. Shamans, most of whom are women, still play a prominent role at funerals, memorials, and other ceremonies and rituals. This split between the northern and southern Kyrgyz in their religious adherence to Muslim practices can still be seen today. Likewise, the Sufi order of Islam has been one of the most active Muslim groups in Kyrgyzstan for more than a century.

Outside Kyrgyzstan

Afghanistan 
The Kyrgyz population of Afghanistan was 1,130 in 2003, all from eastern Wakhan District in the Badakhshan Province of northeastern Afghanistan. They still lead a nomadic lifestyle and are led by a khan or tekin.

The suppression of the 1916 rebellion against Russian rule in Central Asia caused many Kyrgyz later to migrate to China and Afghanistan. Most of the Kyrgyz refugees in Afghanistan settled in the Wakhan region. Until 1978, the northeastern portion of Wakhan was home to about 3–5 thousand ethnic Kyrgyz. In 1978, most Kyrgyz inhabitants fled to Pakistan in the aftermath of the Saur Revolution. They requested 5,000 visas from the United States consulate in Peshawar for resettlement in Alaska, a state of the United States which they thought might have a similar climate and temperature with the Wakhan Corridor. Their request was denied.  In the meantime, the heat and the unsanitary conditions of the refugee camp were killing off the Kyrgyz refugees at an alarming rate. Turkey, which was under the military coup rule of General Kenan Evren, stepped in, and resettled the entire group in the Lake Van region of Turkey in 1982. The village of Ulupamir (or “Great Pamir” in Kyrgyz) in Erciş in Van Province was given to these, where more than 5,000 of them still reside today. The documentary film 37 Uses for a Dead Sheep – the Story of the Pamir Kirghiz was based on the life of these Kyrgyz in their new home. Some Kyrgyz returned to Wakhan in October 1979, following the Soviet occupation of Afghanistan. They are found around the Little Pamir.

China 

The Kyrgyz form one of the 56 ethnic groups officially recognized by the People's Republic of China. There are more than 145,000 Kyrgyz in China.  They are known in Mandarin Chinese as Kē'ěrkèzī zú.

In the 19th century, Russian settlers on traditional Kirghiz land drove a lot of the Kirghiz over the border to China, causing their population to increase in China. Compared to Russian controlled areas, more benefits were given to the Muslim Kirghiz on the Chinese controlled areas. Russian settlers fought against the Muslim nomadic Kirghiz, which led the Russians to believe that the Kirghiz would be a liability in any conflict against China. The Muslim Kirghiz were sure that in an upcoming war, that China would defeat Russia.

The Kirghiz of Xinjiang revolted in the 1932 Kirghiz rebellion, and also participated in the Battle of Kashgar (1933) and again in 1934.

They are found mainly in the Kizilsu Kirghiz Autonomous Prefecture in the southwestern part of the Xinjiang Uygur Autonomous Region, with a smaller remainder found in the neighboring Wushi (Uqturpan), Aksu, Shache (Yarkand), Yingisar, Taxkorgan and Pishan (Guma), and in Tekes, Zhaosu (Monggolkure), Emin (Dorbiljin), Bole (Bortala), Jinghev (Jing) and Gongliu County in northern Xinjiang.  In Akto County, the Akto Turkmen, a former Kyrgyz tribe, now speaks Uyghur.

A peculiar group, also included under the "Kyrgyz nationality" by the PRC official classification, are the so-called "Fuyu Kyrgyz". It is a group of several hundred Yenisei Kirghiz (Khakas people) people whose forefathers were relocated from the Yenisei river region to Dzungaria by the Dzungar Khanate in the 17th century, and upon defeat of the Dzungars by the Qing dynasty, they were relocated from Dzungaria to Manchuria in the 18th century, and who now live in Wujiazi Village in Fuyu County, Heilongjiang Province.  Their language (the Fuyü Gïrgïs dialect) is related to the Khakas language.

Certain segments of the Kyrgyz in China are followers of Tibetan Buddhism.

Pakistan

Kyrgyz are the only Turkic people native to Pakistan. The Kyrgyz in Pakistan live mostly in the north, primarily Chitral, where Kyrgyz is the only Turkic language spoken in Pakistan. There are only a few thousand left, and many have assimilated with Pashtun or the Kho. They used to dominate the region of Gilgit-Baltistan. There are also Afghan refugees of Kyrgyz origin in Pakistan. Some also come from Kyrgyzstan from the Soviet-Afghan War where some defected and settled in Pakistan. There are also Kyrgyz nationals who work in Pakistan.

See also 
 Chala Kazak
 Kyrgyz language
 History of Kyrgyzstan
 Culture of Kyrgyzstan

Notes

References

Sources
 
 
 
 
 
 
 

 
 
    Text was copied from this source, which is available under a  Creative Commons Attribution 4.0 International License.

Further reading 
 Kyzlasov, L.R. "Mutual relationship of terms Khakas and Kyrgyz in written sources of 6–12th centuries". Peoples of Asia and Africa, 1968. 
 Zuev, Yu.A. "Kirgiz – Buruts". Soviet Ethnography, 1970, No 4, .
 Shahrani, M. Nazif. (1979) The Kirghiz and Wakhi of Afghanistan: Adaptation to Closed Frontiers and War. University of Washington Press. 1st paperback edition with new preface and epilogue (2002). .
 Kyrgyz Republic, by Rowan Stewart and Susie Steldon, by Odyssey publications.
 Books by Chokan Valikhanov
 Aado Lintrop, "Hereditary Transmission in Siberian Shamanism and the Concept of the Reality of Legends"
 2002 Smithsonian folklife festival
 Kyrgyz Healing Practices: Some Field Notes
Politics of Language in the Ex-Soviet Muslim States: Azerbaijan, Uzbekistan, Kazakhstan, Kyrgyzstan, Turkmenistan and Tajikistan by Jacob M. Landau and Barbara Kellner-Heinkele. Ann Arbor, University of Michigan Press, 2001. 
Culture of Kyrgyz Republic.Well made JAPANESE pages.
Kyrgyz Textile Art
 Yu Taishan. A Note On The Geographical Location Of Jiankun //  International Journal of Eurasian Studies, Beijing, 2019, No. 9. – pp. 1––5. In Chinese.

External links 

 
 Kirghiz tribal tree, Center for Culture and Conflict Studies, US Naval Postgraduate School

Ethnic groups in Kyrgyzstan
Ethnic groups in Pakistan
Ethnic groups in Afghanistan
Ethnic groups in Uzbekistan
Ethnic groups in China
Turkic peoples of Asia
Modern nomads
Pastoralists
Nomadic groups in Eurasia